Gouka may refer to:

 9708 Gouka, a main-belt asteroid after the Dutch astronomer Adriaan Gouka
 Eric Gouka (born 1970), Dutch cricketer
 Gouka, Benin, a town and arrondissement